= Miguel D. Pedrorena =

American politician

Miguel D. Pedrorena served in the California legislature and as a mayor of San Diego. During the Mexican–American War he served in the US Army.
